Schonfeld Strategic Advisors (also known as Schonfeld and SSA) is an American hedge fund based in New York City. Formed in 1988, it was a pioneer in systematic and algorithmic trading.

Background 

Steven Schonfeld founded Schonfeld as a proprietary trading firm in 1988 with $400,00 that he earned working as a stockbroker for Blinder, Robinson & co. and then Prudential Bache Securities.

The firm made $200 million in 2000 at the peak of the Dot-com bubble but made losses following the Stock market downturn of 2002.

By 2004, Schonfeld employed 1,200 traders with 700 on the proprietary side In 2005, the firm noted that the proprietary traders contribution to the firm's overall revenue declined from 98% five years ago to 60%. Schonfeld Securities, the trading arm of Schoenfeld's capital saw a decline in assets from $2.5 billion in 2000 to $670 million four years later.

In 2006, Schonfeld moved into algorithmic trading as it saw computer driven strategies were going to be faster than traditional trading.

Schonfeld made $200 million off volatility during the 2007–2008 financial crisis.

In 2009, Schonfeld switched from being a proprietary trading firm into a family office that would manage the assets of Steven Schonfeld. In the same year, Quantbot Technologies joined Schonfeld as one of its first quantitative teams to help it manage money.

In 2010, Schonfeld laid off 50 traders due to increased competition from rival firms with computer driven strategies.

In 2015, Schonfeld announced that it would accept capital from investors outside the firm and changed its structure to a Multi-strategy hedge fund.

In 2018, Schonfeld acquired Folger Hill Asset Management, a hedge fund founded by Sol Kumin. One of the  reasons for the acquisition was to help Schonfeld expand in Asia.

In 2019, according to Bloomberg News, Schonfeld achieved an average return of roughly 20% in the past six years which was almost double that of the S&P 500 Index.

Regulatory issues 

On December 1999, the New York Stock Exchange (NYSE) fined Schonfeld and one of its officers $1.5 million for day trading violations. NYSE stated Schonfeld and some of its officers allegedly broke Big Board rules by extending credit to individual customers so they could open accounts while failing to maintain adequate margin for some accounts engaged in day trading.

It was reported by Forbes that Schonfeld has been fined at least twice during 2000 to 2005, by the National Association of Securities Dealers for violation of rules on the Nasdaq Small-order execution system.

In 2009, NYSE fined Schonfeld $1.1 million for performing Round-tripping trades to hide capital shortfalls in 2005. This was done by making trades with related businesses then reversing them to overstate the firm's net capital. Even though Schonfeld engaged in Wash trades, it's capital holdings still fell below the minimum threshold on 25 days in the first quarter of 2005 without alerting regulators.

According to The Wall Street Journal, as of 2015, financial regulators have taken action against Schonfeld 16 times.

References

External links
 

1988 establishments in New York (state)
Financial services companies established in 1988
Hedge fund firms in New York City
Investment management companies of the United States
Privately held companies based in New York City